DC Comics Graphic Novel Collection is a fortnightly partwork magazine published by Eaglemoss Collections and DC Comics in the UK. The series is a collection of special edition hardback graphic novels, collecting significant DC Comics superhero story-arcs as well as bonus origin stories for the characters within.

Overview
The debut issue, Batman: Hush Part 1, was released on 19 August 2015 at the special price of £2.99. The price gradually rose to £9.99 per issue, then £10.99 from issue #37 and £11.99 from issue #107. The initial series of 60 issues was extended to 100 issues, and then to 180.

Eaglemoss no longer offers new subscriptions to this collection.

Similar collections had been released in countries like Germany, Brazil, Poland, Czech Republic, Hungary and Spain but with a different order and contents. A small local test run was also run in select parts of the UK, similar to what happens with most partworks. The German language version of the Collection ended with a total of 150 issues: most are the same as the UK series, but were released in a different order. In December 2020 an email was sent to subscribers to confirm the collection has been extended to 180 issues.

Eaglemoss launched a companion partwork DC Comics The Legend Of Batman in December 2017.

Hachette Partworks launched their own series of hardcover graphic novels, DC Heroes and Villains Collection in January 2021.

Eaglemoss announced they were bankrupt on 11 July 2022, the Webshop is no longer accessible and to date there have been no new subscription deliveries since Issue 170 - 172 in December 2021.

The Subscription Account Website is now no longer operating as of w/c 12 September 2022.

List of books
Below is a working list of the books which will be released as part of the collection. They may change and are different to the line-ups of other countries who share the collection. The information is sourced from an email to their customer services department.

Special issues

The following 'special' books are due to be released as part of the collection with a UK retail price of £21.99. Special issues are available to subscribers at a discounted price of £20.99.

Deluxe special editions (only available online)

The following 'deluxe special edition' books are only available online directly from Eaglemoss. Each book has a UK retail price of £35.99.

Subscriber exclusive issues

References

DC Comics titles
Comic book collection books
Partworks